The Archaeological Survey of India has recognized 20 Monuments of National Importance in Allahabad, Uttar Pradesh.

List of monuments 

|}

References

Allahabad
Monuments
Monuments
Tourist attractions in Allahabad district